Hansel & Gretel Get Baked (also known as Black Forest: Hansel and Gretel and the 420 Witch) is a 2013 American comedy horror film from Mark Morgan, producer of The Twilight Saga film series. Directed by Duane Journey, it stars Michael Welch, Molly Quinn and Lara Flynn Boyle. The film was released in theaters and on VOD on February 19, 2013.

Plot

Gretel's boyfriend Ashton introduces her to a strain of marijuana called "Black Forest" which is produced by an old lady named Agnes in Pasadena. After Gretel exhorts him to get more, Ashton visits Agnes where he is drugged and realizes Agnes is a witch. She then proceeds to eat parts of Ashton's body and eventually sucks out his youth (which restores her youth in turn). Gretel and her brother Hansel begin searching for Ashton, but they are ridiculed by the police and the trail ends with Agnes, who reveals nothing.

Meanwhile, local drug kingpin Carlos intimidates Agnes' dealer Manny into giving him the address of her house. Manny finds Agnes first to warn her about Carlos but is killed by her. When Carlos arrives, she easily dispatches Carlos and turns him into a zombie. The next morning, Gretel and Manny's girlfriend Bianca decide to infiltrate Agnes' house. Before they leave, Gretel emails Hansel that she is going to confront Agnes again.

While Bianca distracts Agnes through various means, Gretel sneaks into the basement where she finds the Black Forest crop, and the remains of the men Agnes has killed. Gretel leaves a trail of Skittles to help her find her way through the Black Forest. Eventually, Agnes sees through the ruse and the two girls are captured. Hansel shows up and is confronted by Carlos. Although Hansel defeats the zombified Carlos, he is knocked out by Agnes and placed in the oven room for cooking preparation.

Gretel and Bianca break out of their cage and stop Agnes right before she cooks Hansel, but Agnes manages to kill Bianca. During the struggle, Gretel manages to push Agnes into the oven and lock her in. The oven explodes, causing the marijuana crop and house to burn down. Hansel and Gretel manage to escape.

As various first responders arrive at the scene, one of them picks up a cat strolling in the ashes into his van. The responder then screams in agony as he is slaughtered in his van. Agnes is now behind the wheel and drives away from the scene.

Cast
Michael Welch as Hansel
Molly Quinn as Gretel
Lara Flynn Boyle as Agnes/The Witch
Lochlyn Munro as Officer Ritter
Yancy Butler as Officer Hart
Cary Elwes as a Meter Man
Bianca Saad as Bianca
Reynaldo Gallegos as Carlos
Celestino Cornielle as Octavio (credited as Celestin Cornielle) 
Joe Ordaz as Jorge
Eddy Martin as Manny
Andrew James Allen as Ashton
Edward Zo as Teenager #1
Doug Haley as Teenager #2
David Tillman as Norm
Danielle Adams as a Paramedic
Lexie Hofer as Coed #1
Orvis Slack as a Paramedic

Producers 
The end credits list Boyle and Quinn as associate producers.

Release 
Hansel & Gretel Get Baked was released in select theaters and on VOD on February 19, 2013.

Note

References

External links
 
 Shock Till You Drop

Bloody Disgusting

2013 comedy horror films
2013 independent films
2013 films
2013 horror films
American supernatural horror films
American comedy horror films
American films about cannabis
Films about cannibalism
American independent films
American zombie comedy films
Films based on Hansel and Gretel
Films set in Los Angeles
Films shot in Los Angeles
Films about witchcraft
Stoner films
2013 comedy films
2010s English-language films
2010s American films